Sorriso is a municipality in the state of Mato Grosso in the Central-West Region of Brazil. The name of the city means literally "smile", but it actually came from the Italian immigrants who only cultivated rice in the region: "only rice" = "só riso". The words ended up merging themselves to form the name of the city.

The city is served by Adolino Bedin Regional Airport.

Arrest of drug lord Luiz Carlos da Rocha aka. "White Head"
One of South America's biggest drug lords, Luiz Carlos da Rocha aka. "White Head" was arrested in Sorriso between 30 June and 1 July 2017.  Brazilian Federal Police said that he was living "a normal social life, he was not worried about being arrested".

See also
List of municipalities in Mato Grosso

References

Municipalities in Mato Grosso